The Immigration (European Economic Area) Regulations may refer to the following UK regulations:

Immigration (European Economic Area) Regulations 2000

Immigration (European Economic Area) Regulations 2006

Immigration (European Economic Area) Regulations 2016

See also
 United Kingdom immigration law